The 2000 Washington Huskies football team represented the University of Washington in the 2000 NCAA Division I-A football season. The Huskies were led by second-year head coach Rick Neuheisel and played their home games on campus in Seattle at Husky Stadium. Washington lost only once, on the road at Oregon, and won the Rose Bowl on New Year's Day to finish with an 11–1 record.

Season summary
On the new FieldTurf at Husky Stadium, Washington opened the 2000 season on September 2 with a 44–20 victory over Idaho. Fourth-ranked Miami traveled to Seattle the next week and senior QB Marques Tuiasosopo threw for 223 yards and ran for 45 as the Huskies handed the Hurricanes their only loss of the season, 34–29.

The following week, Neuheisel led UW against his former team, the Colorado Buffaloes, at Folsom Field in Boulder.  The Huskies celebrated their coach's homecoming with a 17–14 victory. Border rival Oregon spoiled Washington's hopes for a perfect season with a 23–16 setback in the wind in Eugene, but the Huskies responded the next week with a dramatic 33–30 victory over eventual Fiesta Bowl champion Oregon State in the only loss of their season.

In the next five weeks, the Huskies battled back from second half deficits in every game, including a 31–28 win in the rain at Stanford that was marked with tragedy; safety Curtis Williams (1978–2002) was paralyzed after a neck injury late in the third quarter. For the remainder of the season, players and coaches wore the letters "CW" on helmets and uniforms in honor of him; he died from complications less than 19 months later.

After several second half comebacks, Washington was finally able to win a game easily with a 51–3 victory over Washington State in the Apple Cup in Pullman, setting a record for largest margin of victory (48 points) in the series. (The 1990 team led by 52 points, also in Pullman, but reserves allowed a late touchdown.) The win over the Cougars, paired with an Oregon State win over Oregon in the Civil War, put the Huskies in the Rose Bowl, taking the tiebreaker with the better non-conference record.

On New Year's Day in Pasadena, Tuiasosopo earned Rose Bowl MVP honors as he led fourth-ranked Washington to a 34–24 win over #14 Purdue and Drew Brees; the Huskies were third in both final polls.

Schedule

Roster

roster/Player|num=47|class=Sr|first=Pat|last=Conniff|pos=FB}}

| defensive_players=

| special_teams_players=

}}

Rankings

Game summaries

Idaho

Miami (FL)

    
    
    
    
    
    
    
    
    
    

Source:

at Colorado

at Oregon

Oregon State

Source: Box Score

vs. Purdue (Rose Bowl)

NFL Draft selections

Source:

Awards and honors
 Marques Tuiasosopo, Rose Bowl Player of the Game

References

Washington
Washington Huskies football seasons
Pac-12 Conference football champion seasons
Rose Bowl champion seasons
Washington Huskies football